Moore Park may refer to the following places:

Australia 

Moore Park, New South Wales, a park and suburb in Sydney
 Moore Park, Queensland, a town in the Bundaberg Region
Moore Park Beach, Queensland, a locality in the Bundaberg Region
 Moore Park Nature Reserve, a remnant of gallery rainforest in northern New South Wales

Canada 

Moore Park, Toronto in Ontario, Canada

United Kingdom 

 Moorepark, an area of Govan in Glasgow, Scotland

United States 

Moore Park (Oregon), a recreational facility in Klamath Falls, Oregon
 Moore Park, a recreational facility in the Brookline section of Pittsburgh, Pennsylvania

See also 

 Moor Park (disambiguation)